Morris Lamont Chestnut (born January 1, 1969) is an American actor. He first came to prominence for his role as Ricky in the 1991 film Boyz n the Hood. He has appeared in feature films and on television series, including the starring role of FBI Agent Will Keaton in the NBC TV series The Enemy Within.

Early life
Chestnut was born in Cerritos, California on January 1, 1969, the son of Morris and Shirley Chestnut. His mother was a teacher, while his father worked as a medical salesman.  He studied finance and drama at California State University, Northridge. Chestnut worked as a bank teller prior to being an actor.

Career
Chestnut's first professional acting role was as Jason in Freddy's Nightmares – A Nightmare on Elm Street: The Series, season 2, episode 19 ("A Family Affair"), which aired on February 18, 1990. His first feature film role was as Ricky Baker in Boyz n the Hood (1991). He followed that up with roles in various TV movies. Chestnut also played a role on Patti LaBelle's short-lived sitcom Out All Night. His career continued to rise steadily with co-starring roles in standard big-budget studio films such as Under Siege 2: Dark Territory (1995) opposite Steven Seagal and Katherine Heigl and G.I. Jane (1997) opposite Demi Moore. He was also a regular cast member on C-16, in the role of Special Agent Mal Robinson, from 1997 to 1998.<ref>Terrace, Vincent. Encyclopedia of Television Shows, 1925 through 2007 (Jefferson, North Carolina: McFarland & Co., 2008), p.331.</ref>

In 1998, he won the annual Madden Bowl video game competition. In 1999, Chestnut starred in The Best Man with Taye Diggs and Nia Long, as a professional football player on the eve of his wedding. The Best Man earned positive reviews from the press and did well at the box office. For his performance, Chestnut earned an NAACP Image Award nomination. He again played a football player in The Game Plan (2007).

Chestnut starred in The Brothers (2001), a film centering on the themes of fidelity and success among young professionals. That same year, he portrayed Keith Fenton, the love interest of Vivica A. Fox, in Two Can Play That Game and appeared as basketball player Tracey Reynolds in 2002 film Like Mike. In 2004, he played a firefighter named Tommy Drake in Ladder 49.

He has worked with Steven Seagal three times: Under Siege 2: Dark Territory (1995) as Seagal's reluctant partner and lead male villain in Half Past Dead (2002) and Prince of Pistols (2008).

Chestnut joined the cast of Nurse Jackie in 2013, playing war veteran Dr. Ike Prentiss. The following year, he won the NAACP Image Award for Outstanding Supporting Actor in a Comedy Series.

In 2015, Morris Chestnut played Derrick Dog Prince in the movie Heist. People magazine named Morris Chestnut as one of the "Sexiest Men Alive" in 2015.

To prepare for his role as professional football player, Lance Sullivan, in the movie The Best Man Holiday Chestnut had to get back into shape. His fitness training experience with Celebrity Fitness Trainer Obi Obadike inspired him to become Obadike's co-author on the health and fitness book, The Cut. The Cut, published on April 18, 2017, contains exercise drills and recipes. Chestnut earned himself an NAACP image Award nomination for acting in the sequel.

Chestnut played the lead role of pathologist Dr. Beaumont Rosewood Jr. in Rosewood, receiving another NAACP image Award nomination. He appeared as Raymond Dupont in the short-lived drama Our Kind of People.

Personal life
Morris Chestnut has been married to Pam Byse-Chestnut since 1995. The couple has two children, son Grant and daughter Paige. He was raised in the Baptist church, and he is a practicing Christian.

In March 2022, Chestnut was inducted to the Hollywood Walk of Fame with a star that was unveiled in his presence.

He was also a sponsored poker player for Full Tilt Poker.

Filmography

Film

Television

Theatrical performancesLove In The Nick of Tyme (2007)What My Husband Doesn't Know (2011)The Nutcracker'' (2013)

Published work

Awards and nominations

References

External links

 
Morris Chestnut at Yahoo! Movies

1969 births
Living people
African-American male actors
American male film actors
American male television actors
California State University, Northridge alumni
Male actors from California
People from Cerritos, California
20th-century American male actors
21st-century American male actors
African-American Christians
20th-century African-American people
21st-century African-American people